Filippo Lombardi (born 22 April 1990) is an Italian goalkeeper who currently plays for Camerano Calcio in Eccellenza.

References

External links

Living people
1990 births
Italian footballers
Bologna F.C. 1909 players
Association football goalkeepers
A.C. Ancona players
Alma Juventus Fano 1906 players
Bassano Virtus 55 S.T. players
Santarcangelo Calcio players
Eccellenza players
Serie C players
Serie A players
Serie D players
Serie B players